Dan Skuta (born April 21, 1986) is a former American football linebacker. He played college football at Grand Valley State and was signed by the Cincinnati Bengals as an undrafted free agent in 2009. Skuta has also played for the San Francisco 49ers, Jacksonville Jaguars, and Chicago Bears.

Professional career

Cincinnati Bengals
Skuta signed with the Cincinnati Bengals as an undrafted free agent in 2009 and played with them until 2012.

San Francisco 49ers
Skuta signed with the San Francisco 49ers in 2013. He scored his first touchdown when he recovered a fumble forced by linebacker Patrick Willis and returned it 47 yards for the score.

Jacksonville Jaguars
On March 11, 2015, Skuta signed a five-year, $20.5 million contract with the Jacksonville Jaguars. He was released on April 11, 2017.

Chicago Bears
On May 8, 2017, Skuta signed a one-year contract with the Chicago Bears. He was released on September 2, 2017.

Personal life
Dan Skuta is from Flint, Michigan. He attended Grand Valley State University where he graduated with a bachelor's degree in Physical Education. He now resides as the defensive coordinator coach at Flint Michigan powers catholic high school.

References

External links
Chicago Bears bio

1986 births
Living people
American football linebackers
Chicago Bears players
Cincinnati Bengals players
Grand Valley State Lakers football players
Jacksonville Jaguars players
Players of American football from Flint, Michigan
San Francisco 49ers players
People from Burton, Michigan